Dulu Mahato is a politician from Jharkhand, India. He represents the Baghmara (Vidhan Sabha constituency) since the year 2009 (margin 19,960 votes). From 2009 to 2014 he represented the constituency as a Jharkhand Vikas Morcha (Prajatantrik) MLA but from 2014 (margin 29,623 votes) to 2019 he represented the constituency as a Bharatiya Janata Party MLA. In the 2019 assembly election, he contested and won (meager margin of 824 votes) on the  Bharatiya Janata Party ticket.

References 

Jharkhand MLAs 2009–2014
Members of the Jharkhand Legislative Assembly
Year of birth missing (living people)
Place of birth missing (living people)
Living people
Bharatiya Janata Party politicians from Jharkhand
Jharkhand Vikas Morcha (Prajatantrik) politicians